Light in the Attic Records is an independent record label that was established in 2002 in Seattle, Washington by Matt Sullivan. The label is known for its roster of reissue projects and for its distribution catalog. Light in the Attic has re-released work by The Shaggs, Betty Davis, Serge Gainsbourg, Jim Sullivan, Jane Birkin, Monks and The Free Design. The label has also released albums by contemporary bands The Black Angels and Nicole Willis & The Soul Investigators.

History
Already in high school, Sullivan was interested in starting his own label. "I always wanted my own label," Sullivan told The Stranger in 2006, "but it was always the wrong time."

After high school and college at the University of Arizona, Sullivan interned for Seattle, Washington-based record labels like Sub Pop and the now-defunct Loosegroove Records. Susie Tennant, Sub Pop’s then radio-promotions director, offered Sullivan a chance to intern with Madrid, Spain-based record label, Munster Records. Munster Records focused primarily on reissues of bands like The Stooges and Spacemen 3, inspiring Sullivan to begin rethinking his own concept behind the still active idea of starting a record label.  

Upon Sullivan’s return to the states he began producing live shows in the Seattle area including performances by performers like Saul Williams, Clinic, and Kid Koala under the name Light In The Attic. With a stronger interest in the production of records, Sullivan returned to his original idea of a reissue label.

Major projects were, among others:
 a reissue of The Last Poet's first two releases - The Last Poets and This Is Madness.
 the reissue of the soundtrack to 1974 blackploitation film Lialeh composed by Bernard Purdie.
 the reissue of several works from The Free Design.
 Wheedle's Groove, a collection of songs from forgotten soul and funk groups from Seattle, including, amongst others, Patrinell Wright, The Black & White Affair, Kenny G, Ron Buford, Overton Berry
 in 2006, Light in the Attic released the album "Passover" from the psych-rock group The Black Angels. This was their first contemporary release.
 the reissue of Betty Davis' albums Betty Davis and They Say I'm Different. Davis agreed with the project, but did no co-operate.
 In 2009, the label acquired the rights to distribute deceased Serge Gainsbourg's classic album Histoire de Melody Nelson. This was their first project with an already established artist.
 In 2010, they launched their 50th album. This album was a release of old demos by folk-country singer Kris Kristofferson and was named Please Don't Tell Me How The Story Ends: Publishing Demos 1968 - 1972.
 In 2011, the reissue of U.F.O. by singer-songwriter Jim Sullivan.
 In 2014, the label released the compilation album Native North America, Vol. 1.
 In 2017, for the occasion of Record Store Day, they released the official soundtrack of the cult film Ciao! Manhattan in vinyl and CD formats on their Cinewax imprint. This marks the first time that the soundtrack has been commercially released in any form.

Imprints

cinewax
In 2010, Light in the Attic announced their first imprint, cinewax, for vintage and contemporary film. The imprint has released the Winter's Bone Original Soundtrack, Winter's Bone Original Score by Dickon Hinchcliffe, the Project Nim Original Soundtrack also by Dickon Hinchcliffe, and Jennifer Maas' Wheedle's Groove film.

Modern Classic Recordings

Light in the Attic's second imprint, Modern Classic Recordings started in 2011. The imprints first release, Mercury Revs' Deserter's Songs was released in November 2011. Their second release, Morphine's Cure For Pain, will follow in 2012.

Retail and distribution
As well as their own products, Light in the Attic distributes a large portfolio of smaller American and hard-to-find international labels. Light in the Attic currently distributes: Cultures of Soul, Deanwell Global Music, Delmore Recordings, Favorite Recordings, Flat Field Records, Heavenly Sweetness, Heavy Light, Hot Casa, Kindred Spirits, Lion Productions, Masstropicas, Materia Collective, Medical Records, Now-Again, Paradise of Bachelors, Regenerator Records, Rhino Handmade, Secret Seven, Secret Stash, Strawberry Rain, Timmion, Trikont, Vadim Music, Votary Disk/Roundtable, Voyag3r and Golden Pavilion.

Discography

References

External links
 Light In The Attic Records Official Page
 Light In The Attic on Discogs

American independent record labels
Companies based in Seattle
1990s establishments in Washington (state)
Reissue record labels